On Baisakh 6,2047 BS, an interim government headed by Nepali Congress leader Krishna Prasad Bhattarai was formed . The cabinet included 4 Ministers from the Nepali Congress , 3 From leftist front , 2 independent and  2 nominated by king .

See also 
Krishna Prasad Bhattarai

References

1990 establishments in Nepal
1991 disestablishments in Nepal
Cabinets established in 1990
Cabinet of Nepal
Cabinets disestablished in 1991